Perumatty may refer to

 Perumatty, a village in Palakkad district, state of Kerala, India
 Perumatty (gram panchayat), a gram panchayat that serves the above village and others